Asadollah Abbasi (born 1961) is an Iranian conservative politician who currently serves as the governor of Gilan Province, since October 2021.

Early life and education
Abbasi was born in 1961. He holds a degree in education. He received a PhD degree from Islamic Azad University.

Career
Abbasi is a member of the Majlis or Parliament, being a representative of Rudsar. He served as a member of Parliament’s education and research committee. Then he became the deputy head of the committee. Abbasi was named as deputy to then labor minister Abdolreza Sheykholeslami. On 3 February 2013, Sheykholeslam was sacked by the president Mahmoud Ahmadinejad and Abbasi was appointed acting labor minister.

On 24 April, Ahmedinejad proposed him as the minister of labor. Abbasi was approved as the minister by the Majlis on 5 May. Abbasi's term ended on 15 August 2013 and he was replaced by Ali Rabii in the post.

References

1961 births
Living people
Islamic Azad University alumni
YEKTA Front politicians
Government ministers of Iran
Members of the 7th Islamic Consultative Assembly
Members of the 8th Islamic Consultative Assembly
Members of the 10th Islamic Consultative Assembly
21st-century Iranian politicians